This is a list of museums in North Macedonia.

Museum of Contemporary Art (Skopje)
Holocaust Memorial Center for the Jews of Macedonia
Memorial House of Mother Teresa
Museum of the Activists of IMRO from Štip and Štip Region
Museum of the Republic of North Macedonia
Museum of the City of Skopje
Museum of the Macedonian Struggle (Skopje)
National Gallery
Natural History Museum "Dr. Nikola Nezlobinski"
Archaeological Museum of the Republic of Macedonia

See also 

 List of museums
 Tourism in North Macedonia
 Culture of North Macedonia

Museums
 
North Macedonia
Museums
Museums
North Macedonia